Mark D. Hodgins (born September 18, 1947) is an American politician who served one term in the Alaska House of Representatives.

Biography
Hodgins was born in Los Angeles in 1947. He graduated from Cascade High School in Everett, Washington in 1965 and served in the Alaska National Guard from 1966 until 1972. Hodgins later studied at the University of Alaska and at Kenai Peninsula Community College.

Hodgins served in the Kenai Peninsula Borough Assembly from 1987 until 1992. He unsuccessfully ran for the House in 1992 and 1994, both times losing to Mike Navarre, but won in 1996 when Navarre decided to retire. Hodgins was defeated in his 1998 bid for reelection and later moved to North Bend, Oregon, where he is a co-owner of Dent Breakaway Industries. Hodgins unsuccessfully ran for selection to the Coos County Board of Commissioners in May 2011, to replace deceased Commissioner Nikki Whitty.

Personal life
Hodgins and his wife, Audrey, have 2 children: Deni and Andrea.

Electoral history

References

1947 births
Living people
University of Alaska Fairbanks alumni
Republican Party members of the Alaska House of Representatives
Oregon Republicans
Politicians from Los Angeles
People from Kenai Peninsula Borough, Alaska
People from North Bend, Oregon
20th-century American politicians
21st-century American politicians